The Women's sprint cross-country skiing competition at the  2002 Winter Olympics in Salt Lake City, United States, was held on 19 February at Soldier Hollow.

Fifty-eight skiers competed in the qualifying round, of which the 16 fastest competitors advanced to the final rounds. The 16 competitors who advanced from the qualification were divided into 4 quarterfinal heats of 4 skiers each. The two best competitors in each quarterfinal advanced to the semifinal. The two best competitors in each semifinal advanced to the A Final competing for gold, silver, bronze and fourth place. The two lowest ranked competitors in the semifinal were placed in the B Final, competing for ranks from 5th to 8th position.

Results 
 Q — qualified for next round

Qualifying
58 competitors started the qualification race.

Quarterfinals
The 16 competitors who advanced to the final rounds received new bibs which indicated their ranking in the qualification.

Quarterfinal 1

Quarterfinal 2

Quarterfinal 3

Quarterfinal 4

Semifinals
Semifinal 1

Semifinal 2

Finals
Final B

Final A

References

Women's cross-country skiing at the 2002 Winter Olympics
Women's individual sprint cross-country skiing at the Winter Olympics